Aylor may refer to:

 Aylor, Virginia, United States, an unincorporated community
 Mark Aylor (born 1978), American former rugby union flanker
 J.M. Aylor House, a historic house in Hebron, Kentucky, United States

See also
 Ayler